Zenatia is a genus of medium-sized clams, marine bivalve molluscs in the family Mactridae.

Distribution
This genus is endemic to New Zealand.

Species
Species in the genus Zenatia include:
 Zenatia acinaces (Quoy and Gaimard)
 Zenatia zelandica Gray

References
 Powell A. W. B., New Zealand Mollusca, William Collins Publishers Ltd, Auckland, New Zealand 1979 

Mactridae
Bivalves of New Zealand
Bivalve genera